Rosilicie Ochoa Bogh (born June 30, 1972) is an American politician, businesswoman, and former educator who is a member of the California State Senate from the 23rd district. Elected in 2020, she is the first Republican Latina state senator in California's history.

Early life and education 
Ochoa Bogh was born in California, the daughter of Mexican immigrants. As a child, she lived in Hawaii, Mexico, and Florida before settling in San Bernardino, California. She graduated from San Bernardino High School and the University of California, Santa Barbara. Bogh then earned her teaching credential from California State University, San Bernardino.

Career 
After graduating from UC Santa Barbara, Ochoa Bogh worked as an English teacher. She also served on the Yucaipa-Calimesa Joint Unified School District School Board. Ochoa Bogh has since worked as a real estate agent in Yucaipa.

In July 2019, Ochoa Bogh announced her candidacy for the California State Senate. In the nonpartisan blanket primary, she placed second in a field of five candidates, outpolling conservative Beaumont City Councilman Lloyd White. In the November general election, she defeated the Democratic nominee, San Bernardino School Board Trustee Abigail Medina, by a 5% margin and assumed office December 7, 2020. She is the first Latina California state senator of the Republican Party.

Personal life 
Ochoa Bogh met her husband, Greg Bogh, while they were attending San Bernardino High School. Greg Bogh is also a member of the Yucaipa City Council. They have three children and live in Yucaipa, California.

Elections

2020

References

External links
Join California Rosilicie Ochoa Bogh

Living people
1972 births
American people of Mexican descent
American politicians of Mexican descent
University of California, Santa Barbara alumni
Hispanic and Latino American state legislators in California
Hispanic and Latino American women in politics
Republican Party California state senators
Women state legislators in California
21st-century American politicians
21st-century American women politicians